Mart Raud (14 September 1903 – 6 July 1980) was an Estonian poet, playwright and writer.

History
Mart Raud was born in Aidu, Kreis Fellin, Governorate of Livonia.  He attended the village school in Heimtali (today Pärsti Parish) and the parish schools in Paistu and Viljandi. Later he attended the University of Tartu studying literature. In the 1920s, Raud joined the literary movement Arbujad. After the 1940 Soviet occupation of Estonia, however, he was loyal to the new regime and distanced himself from his previous literary companions, many of whom were deported to Siberia. He was married twice. From his first marriage to the educator Lea Raud he had son, children's writer Eno Raud. His second marriage to the translator Valda Raud resulted in daughter Anu Raud and son Annus Raud. His grandchildren are scholar and author Rein Raud, musician and journalist Mihkel Raud and artist and writer Piret Raud.

References 

1903 births
1980 deaths
People from Viljandi Parish
People from the Governorate of Livonia
Estonian male poets
Soviet poets
Soviet male writers
20th-century male writers
20th-century Estonian poets
Soviet military personnel of World War II
People's Writers of the Estonian SSR
Estonian magazine editors
Looming (magazine) editors